= Bhukhi River =

Coordinates: 21°42′N 72°47′E

Bhukhi

Location
- Country: India
- State: Gujarat

Physical characteristics
- Source
  - location: India
- Mouth
  - location: Arabian Sea, India
- Length: 28 km (17 mi)
- Discharge
  - location: Arabian Sea

Bhukhi River is a river in western India in Gujarat whose origin is Near Angia village. Its basin has a maximum length of 28 km. The total catchment area of the basin is 56 km^{2}.
